Giday WoldeGabriel is an Ethiopian geologist at Los Alamos National Laboratory, who co-discovered human skeletal remains at Herto Bouri, Ethiopia, now classified as  Homo sapiens idaltu.

Life 
He graduated from Case Western Reserve University.

An extinct species of prehistoric horse, Eurygnathohippus woldegabrieli, was named in his honor.

References

Los Alamos National Laboratory personnel
Ethiopian geologists
Living people
Year of birth missing (living people)